Luke Mariette (born 8 October 2003) is a Welsh professional footballer who plays as a midfielder for EFL Championship club Blackpool.

Career
On 19 April 2021, Mariette signed his first professional contract with Blackpool. Mariette went on loan to Curzon Ashton for the remainder of the 2021–22 season in March 2022. He debuted with the senior Blackpool side in a 5–0 EFL Championship loss to Peterborough United on 7 May 2022, coming on as a late sub in the 69th minute.

International career
Mariette is a youth international for Wales, having represented the Wales U18s in March 2018.

References

External links
 

2003 births
Living people
People from Denbigh
Sportspeople from Denbighshire
Welsh footballers
Wales youth international footballers
Blackpool F.C. players
Curzon Ashton F.C. players
English Football League players
Northern Premier League players
Association football midfielders